Terry Philip Balsamo II (born October 8, 1972) is an American guitarist and songwriter who is best known as the former guitarist of the American rock bands Cold and Evanescence. Balsamo is noted for his onstage expression of his fondness for Michael Myers of the Halloween film franchise.

Biography

Early projects and Cold

After a brief run with the early line-up of Limp Bizkit in 1995, Balsamo joined fellow Jacksonville rockers Scooter Ward, Sam McCandless, Jeremy Marshall and Kelly Hayes of the band Cold in 1999.

Balsamo wrote and recorded with Cold for their albums 13 Ways to Bleed on Stage (2000) and Year of the Spider (2003). He also appeared alongside Staind in Staind's 2001 MTV Unplugged performance. Near the end of his stint with Cold, the band joined Evanescence as an opening act on the 2003 Nintendo Fusion Tour.

Balsamo briefly re-joined Cold for their early 2009 reunion tour. According to a post on Cold's Facebook page on July 8, 2016, Balsamo was returning to the band for the recording of new music. However, he had departed the group again by January 2018, when Cold announced a new album with a new lineup.

Evanescence
When Evanescence guitarist Ben Moody left the band during the European tour of their debut album Fallen (2003), Balsamo replaced him as lead guitarist on tour and soon joined as Evanescence's permanent guitarist. Balsamo featured on Evanescence's 2004 live album and concert DVD Anywhere but Home, and became singer and pianist Amy Lee's musical collaborator on their second album, The Open Door (2006). Balsamo continued with the band, playing and co-writing on their 2011 self-titled third album. In August 2015, it was announced on the band's Facebook page that Balsamo had parted ways with the band. He performed with the band again in 2019 for the song "Sweet Sacrifice".

Health issues
In October 2005, two days after having finished recording all of his guitar tracks for Evanescence's album The Open Door, Balsamo suffered a stroke from a torn neck artery, leaving the left side of his body paralyzed. The doctors showed him that it was caused by a blood clot in his neck, possibly a result of headbanging on-stage and likely formation of an aneurysm, allowing for pooling of static blood and a thrombus. His doctors did not think he would ever be able to play guitar again. Balsamo however was determined to overcome the paralysis, and began physical therapy and the process of re-training his hand to play.

Equipment

Guitars 

 Ibanez LA Custom Shop
 Ibanez RG3120 Prestige
 Ibanez RG920
 Ibanez RG 2570 VSL Prestige
 Ibanez RG 2570 VSL Prestige Custom
 Ibanez RG570
 Ibanez RG1570 Prestige
 Ibanez Acoustic
 Takamine Acoustic
 Larrivée Acoustic
 Yamaha Silent/Travel Acoustic

 Gibson Les Paul Standard
 Gibson Explorer 7 Strings (Studio)
 Gibson Explorer Dethklok "Thunderhorse"
 Charvel Warren DeMartini Signature San Dimas®, Maple Neck, Cross Swords
 Charvel Warren DeMartini Signature San Dimas®, Maple Neck, Skulls
 Charvel Custom Shop San Dimas
 Charvel San Dimas® Style I HH (Snow White  & Gray)
 Charvel Desolation™ Skatecaster SK-1 FR
 Charvel Desolation™ Skatecaster SK-1 ST
 Charvel Desolation™ Skatecaster SK-3 ST
 PRS SE Baritone Mike Mushok

Amplifiers 

 Mesa Boogie Triple Rectifier Solo Head (LIVE & STUDIO)
 Mesa 4x12 Traditional Rectifier Cabs
 Diezel VH4 Head (STUDIO)
 Bogner Uberschall Head (STUDIO)
 Line 6 4x12 Cabs (LIVE in 2004)

Effects 

 TC Electronic G-System
 Furman PL-Pro C Power Conditioner
 BOSS TU-2: Chromatic Tuner
 BOSS NS-2: Noise Suppressor
 Dunlop MC401 Boost/Line Driver
 Dunlop Jimi Hendrix™ Signature Wah JH1D

 BOSS Ph-2 Phaser or BOSS Ph-3 Phase Shifter

Band projects
Evanescence - guitar (2003–2015; 2019 tour performance)
Cold - guitar (1999–2004, 2009 tour only, 2016-2018)
Shaft - guitar (1996–1999)
Limp Bizkit - guitar (1995)

Discography

Cold
13 Ways to Bleed on Stage (September 12, 2000)
Year of the Spider (May 13, 2003)

Evanescence

The Open Door (October 3, 2006)
Evanescence (October 11, 2011)

References

External links
Evanescence - Official Evanescence site

Evanescence members
American heavy metal guitarists
Songwriters from Florida
Musicians from Jacksonville, Florida
1972 births
Living people
Musicians from Tampa, Florida
Alternative metal guitarists
Guitarists from Florida
Alternative metal musicians